Colin Alexander Tully (20 May 1945 – 25 September 2020) was an Australian rules footballer who played for Collingwood in the VFL during the late 1960s.

Although small in stature, Tully was a long kick of the ball. For example, he goaled with an estimated 70-75 yards drop kick from the centre of the MCG, against Richmond in 1966.

He played his early football at Collingwood as a centreman before developing into a defender and was a member of two losing VFL Grand Finals. He was a Victorian interstate representative in 1967.

Tully continued his playing career in the WANFL with Claremont and represented the state at the 1972 Perth Carnival. He later became coach of the Glenorchy Football Club, and also played for the Donvale Football Club in 1979.

Notes

References

Holmesby, Russell and Main, Jim (2007). The Encyclopedia of AFL Footballers. 7th ed. Melbourne: Bas Publishing.

1945 births
Australian rules footballers from Victoria (Australia)
Collingwood Football Club players
Claremont Football Club players
Glenorchy Football Club coaches
South Bendigo Football Club players
2020 deaths